Susan Scholz is an associate professor and Harper Faculty Fellow at the University of Kansas. Her academic interests lie in Accounting and Information Systems, more specifically Financial Accounting, Restatement of Financial Statements, and the Market for Auditing and Consulting Services.

Education
She received her B.A. in Accounting from The University of Utah and her Ph.D (Business) from University of Southern California.

Honors
She received the Deloitte Wildman Award in 2006.
She serves on the Accounting Horizons editorial board.

References

External links
https://web.archive.org/web/20100621121719/http://www.business.ku.edu/facultyProfiles-S3SQX
http://aaahq.org/pubs/horboard.htm

University of Kansas faculty
University of Utah alumni
Marshall School of Business alumni
Living people
Year of birth missing (living people)